Tatyana Vasilyevna Kazankina (born 17 December 1951 in Petrovsk, Saratov Oblast, Russian SFSR, Soviet Union) is a Soviet/Russian former runner who set seven world records and won a total of three gold medals at the Olympic Games. She was also awarded the Order of the Red Banner of Labour and the title Honoured Master of Sports of the USSR in 1976. Kazankina competed for VSS Burevestnik.

A month before the 1976 Olympic Games in Montreal, Kazankina became the first woman to run 1500 m in under 4 minutes, her time of 3:56.0 beating Ludmila Bragina's world record by 5.4 seconds. She won the 1500 m and 800 m golds in the Montreal games, setting a world record in the latter. In 1980, she ran the 1500 m in 3:52.47, becoming the first woman to run the distance faster than Paavo Nurmi. This stood as a world record for thirteen years.

Her career came to an abrupt end in September 1984 when she was suspended for 18 months for refusing to undertake a drugs test after winning a 1,500m race in 3:58.63 in Paris.

Apart from her sports achievements, Kazankina is known for her scientific works. She graduated from the Faculty of Economics at the Leningrad State University in 1975. Later she defended her dissertation for the Candidate of Pedagogical Science degree at the Lesgaft Institute of Physical Education and worked as a lecturer until 1997. She is the author of more than 20 scientific works.

Kazankina lives in Saint Petersburg where she worked at the State Committee of Physical Culture and Tourism of Russian Federation.

In 2023, she criticized the International Olympic Committee for requiring Russian athletes to compete under a neutral flag and called "absurd" the idea of them condemning the "special military operation".

See also
List of doping cases in sport

References

External links
 Almost Forgotten Star: Interview with Tatiana Kazankina
 Detailed biography  
 http://www.alltime-athletics.com/w_1500no.htm

1951 births
Living people
Athletes (track and field) at the 1976 Summer Olympics
Athletes (track and field) at the 1980 Summer Olympics
Burevestnik (sports society) athletes
Doping cases in athletics
World record setters in athletics (track and field)
Honoured Masters of Sport of the USSR
Olympic athletes of the Soviet Union
Olympic gold medalists for the Soviet Union
People from Petrovsk
Soviet female middle-distance runners
Russian female middle-distance runners
Soviet sportspeople in doping cases
Russian sportspeople in doping cases
World Athletics Championships medalists
Medalists at the 1980 Summer Olympics
Medalists at the 1976 Summer Olympics
Olympic gold medalists in athletics (track and field)
Universiade medalists in athletics (track and field)
Track & Field News Athlete of the Year winners
Universiade silver medalists for the Soviet Union
Medalists at the 1977 Summer Universiade
Friendship Games medalists in athletics
Sportspeople from Saratov Oblast